Marvin Mims Jr. (born March 19, 2002) is an American football wide receiver for the Oklahoma Sooners.

Early life and high school
Mims grew up in Frisco, Texas and attended Lone Star High School. He was named the District 5-5A-I Offensive MVP in his junior season after posting 1,158 yards and 14 touchdowns. As a senior Mims set a national record with 2,629 receiving yards on 117 receptions with 32 touchdown catches and was named Mr. Texas Football and first team USA Today High School All-American. Mims finished his high school career with a state record 5,485 receiving yards. Mims initially committed to play college football at Stanford over offers from Notre Dame and TCU, but later decommitted during his senior year in favor of attending Oklahoma.

College career
Mims joined the Oklahoma Sooners in January 2020 as an early enrollee. In his first game at Oklahoma, Mims caught three passes for 80 yards and a touchdown against Missouri State and scored two more touchdowns the following week in a loss to Kansas State. Mims finished his freshman season with team highs of 37 receptions, 610 receiving yards and nine touchdown receptions, which was also a school freshman record, and was named second team All-Big 12 and an FWAA Freshman All-American. As a sophomore, he led the Sooners with 705 receiving yards on 32 catches with five touchdowns. Mims declared for the 2023 NFL Draft following the 2022 season.

References

External links
Oklahoma Sooners bio

Living people
American football wide receivers
Players of American football from Texas
Oklahoma Sooners football players
People from Frisco, Texas
2002 births